Marcel Pelletier may refer to:

Marcel Pelletier (athlete) (1888–?), Luxembourgian track and field athlete
Marcel Pelletier (ice hockey) (1927–2017), Canadian ice hockey goaltender